Jake's Corner is a 2008 American independent drama film starring Richard Tyson and Danny Trejo.  The title of the film refers to the census-designated place of the same name.

Plot

Cast
 Colton Rodgers as Spence
 Richard Tyson as Johnny Dunn
 Diane Ladd as Fran
 Danny Trejo as Clint
 B. J. Thomas as Doc

Production
The film was shot in three weeks in Jakes Corner, Arizona.

Reception
Laurie Jayne Frost of White Mountain Independent gave the film a positive review and wrote, "go see this movie."  Randy Cordova of The Arizona Republic gave the film a negative review and wrote: "The lunkheaded logic isn't made any more palatable by the script, in which all of Dunn's pals are given silly quirks and blah back stories."

References

External links
 
 

American drama films
American independent films
Films scored by Steve Dorff
Films shot in Arizona
2000s English-language films
2000s American films